Triphenyltin hydride is the organotin compound with the formula (C6H5)3SnH.  It is a white distillable oil that is soluble in organic solvents. It is often used as a source of "H·" to generate radicals or cleave carbon-oxygen bonds.

Preparation and reactions
Ph3SnH, as it is more commonly  abbreviated, is prepared by treatment of  triphenyltin chloride with lithium aluminium hydride.  Although Ph3SnH is treated as a source of "H·", in fact it does not release free hydrogen atoms, which are extremely reactive species.  Instead, Ph3SnH transfers H to substrates usually via a radical chain mechanism.  This reactivity exploits the relatively good stability of "Ph3Sn·"

References

Metal hydrides
Triphenyltin compounds
Reagents for organic chemistry